The 2016–17 season was the 120th season of competitive football in Scotland. The domestic season began on 16 July 2016, with the first round of the 2016–17 Scottish League Cup. The 2016–17 Scottish Professional Football League season commenced on 6 August.

Transfer deals

League competitions

Scottish Premiership

Scottish Championship

Scottish League One

Scottish League Two

Non-league football

Level 5

Level 6

SPFL Development League

Honours

Cup honours

Non-league honours

Senior

Junior
West Region

East Region

North Region

Individual honours

PFA Scotland awards

SFWA awards

Scottish clubs in Europe

Celtic, Aberdeen, Heart of Midlothian and Hibernian qualified for European competition.

Celtic
UEFA Champions League

Aberdeen
UEFA Europa League

Heart of Midlothian
UEFA Europa League

Hibernian
UEFA Europa League

Scotland national team

Women's football

Scottish Women's Premier League

SWPL 1

SWPL2

League and Cup honours

Individual honours

Jane Ross and Caroline Weir were both nominated for the (English) PFA Women's Players' Player of the Year award.

SWPL awards

UEFA Women's Champions League

Glasgow City

Hibernian

Scotland women's national team

The Scotland women's national football team qualified for a major tournament for the first time. A loss by Finland against Portugal confirmed that Scotland would finish qualifying as one of the six best runners-up, guaranteeing a place in UEFA Women's Euro 2017.

Deaths

3 July: Jimmy Frizzell, 79, Greenock Morton inside forward.
July: David Nicol, 80, Falkirk, Stirling Albion and Cowdenbeath wing half.
8 July: Jackie McInally, 79, Kilmarnock, Motherwell and Hamilton Academical forward.
21 July: Dick Donnelly, 74, East Fife and Brechin City goalkeeper, journalist and Radio Tay sports broadcaster.
5 August: Joe Davis, 75, Third Lanark and Hibernian defender.
20 August: Rab Stewart, 54, Dunfermline Athletic, Motherwell, Falkirk and Queen of the South forward.
5 September: Max Murray, 80, Queen's Park, Rangers, Third Lanark and Clyde forward.
13 September: Matt Gray, 80, Third Lanark forward.
16 September: Donald Cameron, 77, Ayr United chairman (2005–08).
19 September: Donnie Fraser, Inverness Caledonian Thistle director (2015–16).
20 September: Alan Cousin, 78, Dundee, Hibernian and Falkirk forward.
1 October: David Herd, 82, Scotland forward.
2 October: Jimmy McIntosh, 80, Falkirk wing-half; Forres Mechanics player/manager.
10 October: Gerry Gow, 64, Scotland under-23 midfielder.
10 October: Eddie O'Hara, 80, Falkirk and Morton winger.
16 October: George Peebles, 80, Dunfermline Athletic and Stirling Albion winger; Stirling Albion manager.
19 October: George McKimmie, 65, Dunfermline Athletic forward.
7 November: Eric Murray, 74, Kilmarnock and St Mirren wing half.
8 November: Ian Cowan, 71, Falkirk, Partick Thistle and Dunfermline Athletic forward.
16 November: Daniel Prodan, 44, Rangers defender.
25 November: Jim Gillespie, 69, Raith Rovers and Dunfermline Athletic winger.
26 November: David Provan, 75, Rangers, St Mirren and Scotland defender; Albion Rovers manager.
6 December: Dave MacLaren, 82, Dundee goalkeeper.
10 December: Tommy McCulloch, 82, Clyde and Hamilton goalkeeper.
11 December: Charlie McNeil, 53, Stirling Albion winger.
18 January: John Little, 86, Queen's Park, Rangers, Morton and Scotland defender.,
27 January: Billy Simpson, 87, Rangers, Stirling Albion and Partick Thistle forward.
18 February: Roger Hynd, 75, Rangers defender and Motherwell manager.
22 February: Paul Morrison, 42, Arbroath midfielder.
27 February: Alex Young, 80, Hearts and Scotland forward.
2 March: Tommy Gemmell, 73, Celtic, Dundee and Scotland full-back; Dundee and Albion Rovers manager.
22 March: Ken Currie, 91, Heart of Midlothian, Third Lanark, Raith Rovers, Dunfermline Athletic and Stranraer inside forward.
1 April: Stuart Markland, 69, Berwick Rangers, Dundee United and Montrose defender.
21 April: Ugo Ehiogu, 44, Rangers defender.
2 May: Cammy Duncan, 51,  Motherwell, Partick Thistle, Ayr United and Albion Rovers goalkeeper.
6 May: Tommy Henaughan, 86, Queen's Park, Kilmarnock and Morton forward.
18 May: Eric Stevenson, 74, Hibernian and Ayr United winger.
19 May: Tommy Ross, 70, Ross County forward.
26 May: Derek Neilson, 58, Brechin City and Berwick Rangers goalkeeper.
18 June: Albert Franks, 81, Rangers, Morton and Queen of the South wing half.
27 June: Stéphane Paille, 52, Hearts midfielder.
28 June: John Higgins, 87, Hibernian and St Mirren defender.

Notes and references

 
Seasons in Scottish football